Albin Nilsson (born 11 August 1993) is a Swedish footballer who most recently played for Trelleborgs FF.

References

External links 
 

Swedish footballers
1993 births
Living people
Allsvenskan players
Superettan players
Ängelholms FF players
Trelleborgs FF players
Association football defenders